This Is Modern Art was a six-part TV series written and presented by the English art critic Matthew Collings.  It was broadcast in 1999 on Channel 4.

Episode Overview 
 I am a Genius - asses the influence of Picasso, Pollock and Warhol and the motifs which connect them. 
 Shock! Horror!
 Lovely Lovely
 Nothing matters
 Hollow Laughter
 The Shock of the Now

Critical reception
The series won several awards including a BAFTA. It became popular both because of its sometimes jokey and sometimes thoughtful explanations of the work and attitude of a new wave of artists that had recently been publicized in the British mass media, and because of its author's witty and irreverent, though clearly highly informed, commentary style.  Collings went on to create several more TV series and programmes for Channel 4, including Impressionism Revenge of The Nice, Self Portraits The Me Generations and This Is Civilisation.

References

External links
 

1999 British television series debuts
1999 British television series endings
1999 in British television